Valor Econômico is the largest financial newspaper in Brazil, according to the Circulation Verification Institute (IVC).

It is the result of a partnership between two of the country's largest media groups: Grupo Globo and Grupo Folha and had its first edition launched on 2 May 2000.

See also

Grupo Folha
Grupo Globo
Folha de S.Paulo
O Estado de S.Paulo
O Globo
Veja
Época

References

External links
Valor Econômico

Grupo Folha
Newspapers published in Brazil
Newspapers established in 2000
2000 establishments in Brazil
Mass media in São Paulo